Robert Hume may refer to:

Robert Deniston Hume (1845–1908), politician, author and businessman
Robert H. Hume (1922–1999), American runner
Rob Hume, ornithologist
Robert Ernest Hume (1877–1948), Indian-born American author, professor, missionary and minister